The Adventures of Marco & Gina is a children's television animated series produced by the European Broadcasting Union (EBU) and France Animation. It was created by Romano Scarpa (and his final project until his death in 2005), and it was aired in 2003.

Plot
Pigeons, doves, sparrows and seagulls live and work together in nearly perfect harmony, way above the madding human crowd in Venice. Venice-Above has existed since time immemorial... or at least as long as Venice-Below. All is not peace and harmony, however, in this miniature replica of the famed city of romance. In each episode, our pigeon heroes Marco and Gina must dodge and foil the sinister Count Yagor and Sgarry, his dim-witted henchman (actually, "henchbird" would be more appropriate).

Production 
Before The Adventures of Marco and Gina, Romano Scarpa was known as Disney comic book's artist. He was also hired to work on DuckTales episodes, Scarpa pitched his own test to the series for Disney, but, the initiative was halted after one test because animating the series in Italy, while guaranteeing best quality, would have taken more time and money than the Asian studios that Disney supported itself on.

In 1988, Scarpa began to developing his own animated series, initially titled as The Winged Venetians with featuring two main characters, Wiggy and Peggy (both names were changed to Marco and Gina), and the show's set taken to Rome. Scarpa wanted to make The Winged Venetians as an animated short film, but he expanded the materials (including concept arts) for 10 years. Lanterna Magica bought the right to The Winged Venetians in 1998, and the show was retitled as Gone With the Wings, until RAI, the Italian television broadcaster, picked up the series.

References

External links
 

2003 Italian television series debuts
2000s animated television series
Italian children's animated adventure television series
Animated television series about birds